John Popelard (born 24 November 1985) is a French professional footballer who plays as a midfielder for Championnat National 2 club Beauvais.

Career

Chambly 
Popelard joined Chambly in 2010, when they were in the Championnat National 3 and helped them to repeated promotions until they reached the professional Ligue 2 in 2019. He made his professional debut with the club in a 0–0 Ligue 2 tie with Sochaux on 18 October 2019.

After relegation from the Ligue 2 in the 2020–21 season, Popelard decided to quit Chambly, where he had spent his entire career.

Beauvais 
In June 2021, Popelard signed for Championnat National 2 club Beauvais.

Notes

References

External links
 
 
 Foot National Profile

1985 births
Living people
People from Senlis
French footballers
Association football midfielders
US Chantilly players
FC Chambly Oise players
AS Beauvais Oise players
Championnat National 3 players
Championnat National 2 players
Championnat National players
Ligue 2 players
Sportspeople from Oise
Footballers from Hauts-de-France